Susraal Mera is a 2014–15 soap series that aired on Hum TV. Series was written by Nuzhat Saman, directed by Saima Waseem and Produced by Momina Duraid of MD Productions. It stars an assemble cast of Zarnish Khan, Behroze Sabzwari, Umair Lagari, Ahsan Qadir, Imran Aslam (actor), Madiha Hussain Zaidi, Mahjabeen Habib, Maryum Tariq, Rozina, Mehmood Akhter, Myra Sajid, Shaista Jabeen, Ali Asghar Abbas and Anas Ali Imran. At 3rd Hum Awards series won all of its three nominations including: Best Soap Actor for Imran Aslam, Best Soap Actress for Zarnish Khan and Best Soap Series for Momina Duraid.

Outline
Sasural Mera is a story of two sisters, Alina and Alizeh. Alina is fun-loving and vivacious girl while Alizeh is career-oriented and serious. Their father Bashir Ahmed is a businessman and guardian of his sister-in-law and her two sons Nauman and Salman. In a family wedding, they meet Jabbar Ahmed’s family. Jabbar has a very conservative mind-set and considers domestic violence as his right. Jabbar’s son, Adil falls for Alizeh and they trick Bashir Ahmed and his family into believing that Jabbar’s family is as liberal and well-educated as their own. Adil and Alizeh get married but soon she discovers the true faces of Jabbar’s family. The story takes a new turn when Adil’s sister, Nimra falls for Salman and starts underhand tactics to manipulate Salman, Alina and Alizeh.

Cast

Accolades 

At 3rd Hum Awards soap won all of its nominations:

 Best Soap Actor - Imran Aslam
 Best Soap Actress - Zarnish Khan
 Best Soap Series - Momina Duraid

References

External links
 official website

Pakistani television soap operas
2014 Pakistani television series debuts
2014 Pakistani television series endings
Pakistani drama television series
Urdu-language television shows
Hum TV original programming